Naketia Marie "Ketia" Swanier (born August 10, 1986) is an American professional basketball player born in Columbus, Georgia. She most recently played the guard position for the Atlanta Dream in the WNBA.

College career
Swanier was the only freshman to open the season as UConn's starting point guard. She finished her career as the only player in UConn history to rank among the top 10 career leaders in games played, assists and steals. Swanier won the inaugural Big East Sixth Man of the Year Award as a senior coming off the bench behind Renee Montgomery.

Connecticut statistics
Source

WNBA career
Swanier was selected 12th overall by the Connecticut Sun in the 2008 WNBA Draft. She played in 25 of 34 possible games, with 6 starts. She ranked 14th in the league in steals per 40 minutes (2.24). On June 1 Swanier was waived by the Connecticut Sun because of the 11-woman roster cuts. The next day she was signed by the Phoenix Mercury.

Overseas career
She is currently playing for KS JAS FBG Sosnowiec in Poland during the 2008–09 WNBA off-season.

See also
 2008 WNBA Draft

References

External links
WNBA Player Profile

1986 births
Living people
American expatriate basketball people in Poland
American women's basketball players
Atlanta Dream players
Basketball players from Columbus, Georgia
Connecticut Sun draft picks
Connecticut Sun players
Phoenix Mercury players
Point guards
UConn Huskies women's basketball players